The  Party for Peace, Democracy, Reconciliation, and Reconstruction (PPDRR)  is a small political party in Burundi.

Political parties in Burundi